Corentin Denolly and Alexandre Müller were the defending champions but chose not to defend their title.

Sriram Balaji and Jeevan Nedunchezhiyan won the title after defeating Romain Arneodo and Jonathan Eysseric 6–4, 6–7(3–7), [10–7] in the final.

Seeds

Draw

References

External links
 Main draw

Internationaux de Tennis de Blois - Doubles
2022 Doubles